Novoandreyevka is a rural locality (a selo) in Velikoknyazevsky Selsoviet of Belogorsky District, Amur Oblast, Russia. The population was 119 as of 2018. There are 2 streets.

Geography 
Novoandreyevka is located on the left bank of the Zeya River, 56 km west of Belogorsk (the district's administrative centre) by road. Velikoknyazevka is the nearest rural locality.

References 

Rural localities in Belogorsky District